Six ships of the Royal Navy have borne the name HMS Firedrake after the legendary creature:

 was a 12-gun bomb vessel launched in 1688 and captured by the French in 1689.
 was a 12-gun bomb vessel launched in 1693.  She foundered in 1710.
 was a 12-gun bomb vessel launched in 1741 and sold in 1763.
 was a fireship purchased in 1794 and sold in 1807.
 was an  launched in 1912 and sold in 1921.
 was an F-class destroyer launched in 1934 and sunk in 1942.

Royal Navy ship names